Quererlo todo (International title: To Want It All) is a Mexican telenovela produced by Ignacio Sada Madero that aired on Las Estrellas from 9 November 2020 to 25 April 2021. It is an adaptation of the Argentine telenovela titled Herencia de amor created by Enrique Estevanez. It stars Michelle Renaud and Danilo Carrera. Production of the series began on 3 August 2020 and concluded on 20 February 2021. The story takes place in a town called "El Rosario", where the Montes family, heirs of "La Noria" farm, will fight fiercely for wealth and power.

Plot 
Valeria Fernández (Michelle Renaud) has been the lifelong girlfriend of Leonel Montes (Víctor González) without ever questioning her love for him. After Leonel's father, a wealthy landowner, dies, a war begins between the heirs to the fortune. In the midst of this commotion, Valeria meets Mateo Santos (Danilo Carrera), son of the executor of the inheritance, and will fall in love with his nobility and passion for life.

Cast 

 Michelle Renaud as Valeria Fernández Cosío
 Danilo Carrera as Mateo Santos Coronel
 Víctor González as Leonel Montes Larraguibel
 Sara Corrales as Sabina Curiel
 Scarlet Gruber as Sandy Cabrera Tellez
 Alexis Ayala as Artemio Cabrera
 Olivia Bucio as Dalia Coronel de Santos
 Eugenia Cauduro as Esmeralda Santos Coronel
 Luz María Jerez as Minerva Larraguibel
 Roberto Blandón as Tirso Quintero
 Mimi Morales as Magdalena Bustamante
 Juan Ángel Esparza as Father Gabriel
 Claudia Troyo as Luisa Zermeño
 Sachi Tamashiro as Berenice Cabrera Tellez
 Gina Predet as Eva Téllez
 Ignacio Guadalupe as Servando
 Rubén Branco as Remi
 Jorge Gallegos as Basurto
 Lalo Palacios as Lorenzo
 Marcos Moreno as Alejandro Moreno
 Fabiola Andere as Corina
 Enrique Montaño as Juan
 Karen Leone as Camelia
 Nacho Ortiz Jr. as Facundo
 Zoe Itzayana as Angelita
 Alejandro Tommasi as Aarón Estrada

Recurring 
 Mundo Siller as Justino

Guest stars 
 Manuel Ojeda as Patricio Montes
 Mirta Reneé as Amara
 Martín Muñoz as Dr. Flavio
 Eduardo Marbán as Fercho
 Vanessa Mateo as Jessica
 Gregorio Reséndiz

Ratings

Episodes

References

External links 
 

2020 telenovelas
2020 Mexican television series debuts
2021 Mexican television series endings
Televisa telenovelas
Mexican telenovelas
Mexican television series based on Argentine television series
Spanish-language telenovelas